The 2013-14 NBB Cup was the 46th season of the NBB Cup. It was managed by the Nationale Basketball Bond (English: National Basketball Federation). SPM Shoeters Den Bosch were the defending champion having won the cup the previous season.

The championship game was played on 30 March 2014 at the Landstede Sportcentrum in Zwolle. Finalists were Zorg en Zekerheid Leiden and GasTerra Flames. GasTerra Flames won 79–71.

Participants 
The draw was held on 19 July 2013 in Nieuwegein. Teams in bold play in the Dutch Basketball League (DBL).

Fourth round

|}

Quarterfinals

|}

Semifinals

|}

Final

References

NBB Cup
NBB Cup